Life Bites – Pillole di vita is an Italian television series broadcast on Disney Channel Italia from 2007 to 2013. A situation comedy aimed at teenagers, the show's protagonists are Giulia (played by Valentina Colombo) and her brother Teo (played by Luca Solesin). The series' director is Gianluca Brezza. The episodes—5-minute-long sketches—are designed to present brief glimpses into the daily lives of the protagonists and those of their friends and family. Life Bites – Pillole di vita was originally devised and developed in Disney Italia's short-form programming hub based in Milan and has been subsequently adapted in several other countries: in the UK as Life Bites, in France as Tranches de Vie, in Germany as Life Bites, and in Spain as Cosas de Vida.

See also
List of Italian television series

References

External links
 

Italian television series
2007 Italian television series debuts  
2013 Italian television series endings